Rafinesquia neomexicana is a species of flowering plant in the family Asteraceae.  Common names include desert chicory, plumeseed, or New Mexico plumeseed. It has white showy flowers, milky sap, and weak, zigzag stems, that may grow up through other shrubs for support. It is an annual plant (completes its life cycle in a single season) found in dry climate areas of the southwestern deserts of the US and northwestern deserts of Mexico.

Description

White flowerheads appear at the end of the stems between May and June in the species native range.

Flower heads occur singly at the tip of branches. The flower heads are composed of strap-shaped ray flowers, growing longer toward the outer portion of the head, and collectively creating the appearance of a single flower as in other sunflower family plants.

Similar species include R. californica and Calycoseris wrightii.

Distribution and habitat
In the United States the species occurs in California, Nevada, Utah, Arizona, New Mexico and Texas. It occurs in the Mexican states of Baja California and Sonora.

It is found in the Mojave Desert, and in the Sonoran Deserts including the Colorado Desert sub-region.

It occurs in sandy or gravelly soils in creosote bush scrub and Joshua Tree woodland plant communities in the Mojave Desert and Sonoran Desert, from California to Texas and northern Mexico.

References

External links
Jepson Manual Treatment of Rafinesquia neomexicana
Rafinesquia neomexicana — UC Photo gallery

Cichorieae
Flora of Arizona
Flora of Baja California
Flora of the California desert regions
Flora of New Mexico
Flora of Sonora
Flora of Texas
Flora of Utah
Flora of the Sonoran Deserts
Natural history of the Colorado Desert
Natural history of the Mojave Desert
Taxa named by Asa Gray
Plants described in 1853